Morgan Grace may refer to:

 Morgan Grace (politician) (1837–1903), New Zealand politician and surgeon
 Morgan Grace (musician), American songwriter and singer